TIR domain-containing adapter molecule 2 is a protein that in humans is encoded by the TICAM2 gene.

TIRP is a Toll/interleukin-1 receptor (IL1R; MIM 147810) (TIR) domain-containing adaptor protein involved in Toll receptor signaling (see TLR4; MIM 603030).[supplied by OMIM]

References

Further reading

External links